Petros Giakoumakis (born 3 July 1992) is a Greek professional footballer who plays as a forward for Cypriot First Division club Olympiakos Nicosia, on loan from Lamia.

Career
Born in Crete, Giakoumakis began playing football for Olympiakos Chersonissos and started his professional career after moving to Atsalenios in 2011. During his last season with the club Petros Giakoumakis scored 19 goals in 25 appearances, however his contribution was not enough for Atsalenios to remain in the Football League 2 and were relegated to the Heraklion FCA championships for the first time in 18 years.

His good performances with Atsalenios did not go unnoticed by a number of Superleague clubs, with Panionios and OFI showing interest in signing the young forward for the summer transfer period of 2014. Platanias also invited him for a few-days-long trial in order to be checked out by then-Platanias manager Giannis Christopoulos. OFI Crete was close enough to capture the forward's signature, but negotiations between Atsalenios and OFI bitterly fell through – in the end, Giakoumakis signed a five-year contract for Levadiakos on 1 August 2014.

On 8 June 2019, Giakoumakis joined Atromitos, signing a contract until the summer of 2021, on a free transfer. On 6 October, he scored his first goal for Atromitos in a 3–2 away win against Volos. He scored a last-minute winner from Clarck N'Sikulu's assist at home to OFI Crete on 24 November. He then scored another last-minute winner against Panetolikos away from home, on 11 January 2020.

On 16 September 2021, Giakoumakis joined Veria NFC, signing a one-year contract, on a free transfer.

Career statistics

References

External links
Scoresway Stats Centre
Superleague Greece profile

1992 births
Living people
Super League Greece players
Super League Greece 2 players
Levadiakos F.C. players
Atromitos F.C. players
Veria NFC players
PAS Lamia 1964 players
Olympiakos Nicosia players
Association football forwards
Footballers from Heraklion
Greek footballers